Ladomirovka is a rural locality (a selo) and the administrative center of Ladomirovskoye Rural Settlement, Rovensky District, Belgorod Oblast, Russia. The population was 755 as of 2010. There are 5 streets.

Geography 
Ladomirovka is located 45 km north of Rovenki (the district's administrative centre) by road. Sidorov is the nearest rural locality.

References 

Rural localities in Rovensky District, Belgorod Oblast